Hard sign with grave (Ъ̀ ъ̀) is a letter that can be used in Bulgarian. It denotes a stressed Ъ. For example, it can be used in the word ъ̀гъл, meaning 'corner' and въ̀лна 'wool'.

References